The Wolf and His Mate is a 1918 American silent adventure film directed by Edward LeSaint and starring Louise Lovely, Jack Hoxie and Betty Schade.

Cast
 Louise Lovely as Bess Nolan
 Jack Hoxie as Donald Bayne, 'The Wolf' 
 George Odell as Steve Nolan 
 Betty Schade as Vida Burns
 Georgia French as Rose Nolan
 Hector Dion as 'Snaky' Burns

References

Bibliography
 Rainey, Buck. Sweethearts of the Sage: Biographies and Filmographies of 258 actresses appearing in Western movies. McFarland & Company, 1992.

External links
 

1918 films
1918 adventure films
American silent feature films
American adventure films
American black-and-white films
Universal Pictures films
Films directed by Edward LeSaint
1910s English-language films
1910s American films
Silent adventure films